"I Believe" is a song by German pop group Bro'Sis. It was written by Alex Christensen, Jens Klein, Peter Könemann, and Clyde "J. Ena" "Ward and produced by the former for their debut studio album, Never Forget (Where You Come From) (2001). The song was released as the band's debut single on 3 December 2001 following their formation on the RTL II reality television show Popstars – Du bist mein Traum. It became the year's Christmas number one in Germany and spent five consecutive weeks at number one, achieving a triple platinum certification from the Bundesverband Musikindustrie (BVMI).

Track listing

Credits and personnel 

 Ross Antony – vocals
 Hila Bronstein – vocals
 Alex Christensen – writing, production, scratches
 Jens Klein – keyboards, programming, editing, mixing
 Peter Könemann – keyboards, programming, editing

 Shaham Joyce – vocals
 Faiz Mangat – vocals
 Indira Weis – vocals
 Giovanni Zarrella – vocals

Charts

Weekly charts

Year-end charts

Certifications

References 

2001 songs
2001 debut singles
Bro'Sis songs
Polydor Records singles
Number-one singles in Austria
Number-one singles in Germany
Number-one singles in Switzerland
Song recordings produced by Alex Christensen
Songs written by Alex Christensen